Vrutice is a municipality and village in Litoměřice District in the Ústí nad Labem Region of the Czech Republic. It has about 300 inhabitants.

Administrative parts
The village of Svařenice is an administrative part of Vrutice.

History
The first written mention of Vrutice is from 1088, when it was owned by the Vyšehrad Chapter.

References

Villages in Litoměřice District